David Moberg may refer to:

David Moberg (journalist), journalist for In These Times
David O. Moberg (born 1922), scholar of religion

See also
 David Moberg Karlsson, (born 1994), Swedish footballer